Károli Gáspár University of the Reformed Church in Hungary (Hungarian: Károli Gáspár Református Egyetem) is a Christian university in Budapest, Hungary. The university has more than 7000 students. The university has four faculties and offer courses leading to degrees at the bachelor, master and doctoral levels.

Notable students and alumni
 Áron Szilágyi : three-time Olympic champion, World and European champion fencer, student of psychology
 Gabriella Szabó: three-time Olympic champion, World and European champion sprint canoer, student of law
 Csanád Szegedi: politician
 Róbert Puzsér: publicist, social critic
 Leila Gyenesei : World Champion modern pentathlete, student of law
 Dóra Deáki : CWC-winner, Champions League silver medallist handball player, student of German

References

Enikő Sepsi, Péter Balla, Márton Csanády (2014). Confessionality and University in the Modern World - 20th Anniversary of the "Károli" University. Studio Caroliensia

External links

 Faculty of Theology 
 Faculty of Humanities 
 Faculty of Law 
 Faculty of Teacher Training

Károli Gáspár University of the Reformed Church in Hungary
1855 establishments in the Austrian Empire
Christianity in Budapest
Education in Budapest
Educational institutions established in 1855